Tachina corylana is a species of fly in the genus Tachina of the family Tachinidae that is endemic to Latvia.

References

Insects described in 1834
Diptera of Europe
Fauna of Latvia
corylana